The 2002 ARAG World Team Cup was a men's team tennis tournament played on outdoor clay courts. It was the 24th edition of the World Team Cup and was part of the International Series of the 2002 ATP Tour. It took place at the Rochusclub in Düsseldorf in Germany from May 19 through May 25, 2002.

Australia were the defending champions but did not compete that year.

Argentina defeated Russia in the final to win the title for the second time.

Players

Red Group

José Acasuso (# 95)
Lucas Arnold (# 34 Doubles)
Guillermo Cañas (# 16)
Gastón Etlis (# 36 Doubles)

Arnaud Clément (# 26 Doubles)
Nicolas Escudé (# 27)

Jonas Björkman (# 15 Doubles)
Thomas Enqvist (# 22)
Thomas Johansson (# 8)

James Blake (# 38)
Jared Palmer (# 1 Doubles)
Andy Roddick (# 13)
Pete Sampras (# 11)

Blue Group

Karsten Braasch (# 44 Doubles)
Lars Burgsmüller (# 78)
Tommy Haas (# 2)
Nicolas Kiefer (# 58)
Philipp Kohlschreiber (# 426)

 Tim Henman (# 6)
 Martin Lee (# 96)
 Miles Maclagan (# 1093 Doubles)

Andrei Cherkasov (# 537)
Yevgeny Kafelnikov (# 4)
Marat Safin (# 5)

Galo Blanco (# 91)
Àlex Corretja (# 21)
Albert Costa (# 19)

Round robin

Red Group

Standings

United States vs. France

Sweden vs. Argentina

United States vs. Argentina

Sweden vs. France

United States vs. Sweden

France vs. Argentina

Blue Group

Standings

Spain vs. Great Britain

Russia vs. Germany

Germany vs. Great Britain

Russia vs. Spain

Spain vs. Germany

Russia vs. Great Britain

Final

Russia vs. Argentina

See also
 Davis Cup
 Hopman Cup

References
 2002 ARAG World Team Cup draw

External links
 World Team Cup official website

ARAG ATP World Team Championship
Arag World Team Cup, 2002
World Team Cup